The Finnish Ice Hockey Association is the governing body of ice hockey in Finland. In 1927, the Finnish Skating Association introduced ice hockey as part of its program and, through that organization, Finland joined the International Ice Hockey Federation (IIHF) in 1928. The Finnish Ice Hockey Association was formed on 20 January 1929 and featured seventeen clubs. Since the late 1980s, Finland has enjoyed a period of success on the international stage and, the men's national team is ranked first in the world and the women's national team is ranked third in the world by the IIHF.

The Finnish Ice Hockey Association has heavily invested in youth development to produce world class ice hockey players.

National teams
  Finland men's national ice hockey team
  Finland men's national junior ice hockey team
  Finland men's national under-18 ice hockey team
  Finland women's national ice hockey team
  Finland women's national under-18 ice hockey team

Presidents
 Harry Lindblad, 1957 to 1975
 Kalervo Kummola, 1997 to 2016

References

External links
 

Ice hockey in Finland
International Ice Hockey Federation members
Finland
Ice
Sports organizations established in 1929
1929 establishments in Finland